Ryan Jungwook Hong (홍정욱; born March 14, 1970) is a Korean entrepreneur, businessman, and politician. Hong is the chairman and owner of Herald Corporation and related companies, a leading content and lifestyle group in Korea, and the founding chairman of Organica, a pioneering Korean natural food company. Hong also heads the Olje Foundation, a non-profit organization promoting classics education.

Biography 
Ryan Jungwook Hong was born in Seoul, Korea, the son of Won Namgung (Kyungil Hong), a celebrated Korean actor. Hong graduated from Apgujeong Elementary School and Apgujeong Middle School in Seoul. He left Korea in 1985 to study in the U.S. and went on to graduate from Choate Rosemary Hall in 1989. He received his A.B., magna cum laude, in East Asian Studies from Harvard University in 1993 and J.D. from Stanford Law School in 1998. He also studied political science at Seoul National University in Korea and international politics at the graduate school of Peking University in China.

After passing the New York State Bar in 1998, Hong joined the Mergers and Acquisitions Group at Lehman Brothers in New York, but left the firm in 1999 to co-found an internet startup in California. In 2001, he returned to Korea to fulfill his military duty. In December 2002, he acquired Herald corporation, a venerable newspaper company, in a leveraged buyout. He turned the company around and quickly expanded its business into the internet, broadcasting, magazines, and education.

In 2008, Hong resigned as chairman of Herald corporation and was elected to the National Assembly of the Republic of Korea, representing Nowon District in Seoul. Serving on the Foreign Affairs, Trade and Unification Committee, he was the chairman of the ruling Grand National Party's International Affairs Committee and the Honorary Ambassador of Grant Aid for the Korean government. In 2012, however, he decided not to seek reelection and returned to his companies.

Upon return, Hong transformed Herald corporation into a content and lifestyle group with businesses ranging from media and education to natural foods and biodegradable plastics. Herald corporation publishes The Korea Herald, the nation's dominant English newspaper, and The Herald Business, Korea's largest afternoon financial daily; runs Herald Edu, Korea's largest English immersion campus network; manages Herald Artday, an online art auction company, and Herald Design Forum, one of Asia's premier design forums; and owns Biota, a manufacturer of biodegradable plastic films. Since 2005, Herald corporation has enjoyed over a decades of consecutive of growth and profitability, and is now one of Korea's most profitable media companies.

In 2013, with the belief that "within nature lies cure for humanity," Hong also founded Organica, a pioneering premium natural food company offering whole foods, natural snacks, cold-press juices, and salads. Organica's brands include Just Juice, Korea's premier cold-press HPP juices, and Season to Season, a premium selection of organic grains and superfoods. Through acquisitions and expansions, Hong is propelling Organica to serve as a benchmark for natural foods not only in Korea but also throughout Asia. His recent acquisitions include Cheonbo Natural Food, a leading organic grains distributor, in 2013, and Ansung Production Center, large-scale HPP facilities of CJ CheilJedang, in 2015, and Green Farm, an organic vegetable supplier, in 2016.

Philanthropy 
In 2011, Hong established Olje Foundation, a non-profit organization promoting classics publication and education by offering Olje Classics and Olje Selections – a carefully curated series of Western and Eastern literature, philosophy, religion, and history books – to the public at low costs and donating 20% of the books to schools, libraries, armed forces, prisons, etc.

Hong has served on the Board and the Operating Advisory Committee of the National Museum of Korea since 2008 and has been a member of the Choate Board of Trustees since 2016, in addition to founding the Young Friends of the Museum. He is also a member of the Operating Committee of the Seoul National University Museum of Art. In 2014, Hong founded Herald Philharmonic Orchestra to promote and support classical music.

In 2015, Hong engaged both Herald corporation and Organica to fund World Wide Fund for Nature's premier ecological footprint report for Korea and help WWF Korea protect endangered species and increase the awareness of climate change. A strong proponent of a plant-based diet, he has championed diverse initiatives to support organic farming and sustainable foods in Korea.

Recognition 
In 2005, Hong was selected as a Young Global Leader by the World Economic Forum in 2005, an Asia 21 Fellow by Asia Society in 2006, and a Young World Leader by the BMW Foundation Herbert Quandt in 2008. During his 4-year term in the National Assembly of the Republic of Korea, he won numerous awards, honors, and distinctions. He also received an honorary doctorate degree in political science at Yongin University.

Publication 
In 1993, Hong authored Seven Acts Seven Scenes, a memoir of his experience in the U.S. and China, which has sold over 1.3 million copies to date.

Personal life 
Hong and his wife, Nicole Junghee Sohn, a ceramics sculpture artist, live in Seoul, Korea. They have three children, Josephine Jisung, Claire Jisu, and Alexander Euisung.

References

External links
 Jungwook Hong Facebook
 Jungwook Hong Website
 Jungwook Hong collected news and commentary at The Korea Herald 
 Jungwook Hong collected news and commentary at The Herald Business 

1970 births
Living people
People from Seoul
Korean politicians
Liberty Korea Party politicians
Stanford Law School alumni
Harvard University alumni